Marinus Cornelis "Rinus" van Beek (18 July 1947 - 7 March 2018) was a Dutch swimmer. He competed at the 1968 Summer Olympics in the 200 m backstroke event, but failed to reach the final. After his career he became an architect.

References

1947 births
2018 deaths
Dutch male backstroke swimmers
Olympic swimmers of the Netherlands
Swimmers at the 1968 Summer Olympics
Swimmers from Amsterdam
20th-century Dutch people